All Good Things is an American Alternative rock band formed in Los Angeles in 2013. The group consists of Dan Murphy (vocals), Andrew Bojanic (guitars, bass, vocals, keyboards, producer), Liz Hooper (bass, vocals, keyboards, producer), Miles Franco (guitars, bass, vocals), and Tim Spier (drums, vocals). They were signed to Better Noise Records in 2019 after their song "For The Glory" and their album Machines appeared in multiple television and film advertisements, such as for the NHL, WWE, Sony PlayStation, and their music videos were streamed and viewed more than 100 million times.

The band signed with the Better Noise Records label in 2019 and released the single "Kingdom" from their forthcoming album.

Band Members 
PRESENT
Dan Murphy - vocals, guitar
Andrew Bojanic - guitar, vocals
Liz Hooper - bass, keyboard, vocals
Miles Franco - guitar, bass, vocals
Tim Spier - drums, vocals
PAST
Joe Pringle - vocals
Phil X - vocals, guitar
Randy Cooke - drums

Discography

Albums

Singles

Music videos

References

Musical groups from Los Angeles
Rock music groups from California

de:All Good Things